South Holland and The Deepings is a constituency represented in the House of Commons of the UK Parliament, since its 1997 creation, by John Hayes, a Conservative.

At the 2017 general election, the constituency recorded a higher Conservative share of the vote than any constituency since 1970, with 69.9% of voters backing the party. South Holland also delivered the nation's second highest Leave vote in the 2016 referendum on the United Kingdom's membership of the European Union. 73.6% of voters endorsed Britain's withdrawal from the EU, second only to neighbouring Boston.
At the 2019 general election, the Conservative majority was 62.7%, the highest of any Conservative in any constituency in any general election since Kensington South in 1955. Hayes took 75.9% of the vote, the third highest for the Conservatives only after Castle Point in Essex and Boston and Skegness.

Constituency profile
This is a largely rural seat with agriculture, bulb growing and food processing as the main economic activities. Incomes and house prices are below UK averages.

Boundaries

1997–2010: The District of South Holland, with the wards of Deeping St James, Market Deeping, West Deeping and Truesdale, which are all in the District of South Kesteven.

2010–present: The District of South Holland, with Deeping St James, Market Deeping and West Deeping.

The constituency was created in 1997 from parts of the former seats of Holland with Boston and Stamford and Spalding. It covers the area around Spalding.  It roughly corresponds to the local government District of South Holland, but with Market Deeping, Deeping St James and West Deeping added.

In minor boundary changes that were put in place for the 2010 general election, parts of the two civil parishes of Baston and Langtoft, forming much of the Truesdale ward, were moved to the neighbouring constituency of Grantham and Stamford. This made Market Deeping and Deeping St James the only South Kesteven parishes to stay in the constituency, the remainder being in South Holland District.

History
The last non-Conservative member for the predecessor main seat was Sir Herbert Butcher (served 1937–1966) who for much of that time was in the National Liberal Party set up in 1931.

The member from 1966 until 1997 was Richard Body for the main contributor seat (in later years as MP, knighted), who had previously been an MP during the Eden government and the start of the Macmillan government for Billericay, and later wrote assertive books on agriculture and on the Common Agricultural Policy.

In the 2017 general election, the seat returned the highest vote share for the Conservatives nationally at 69.9%. In the 2019 general election, it was an extremely safe Conservative seat. It had the largest percentage majority, third-largest absolute majority, and third-largest Conservative vote share of any seat held by the party; nationally the seat had the eleventh-largest percentage majority of any constituency.

Members of Parliament

Elections

Elections in the 2010s

Elections in the 2000s

Elections in the 1990s

See also
 List of parliamentary constituencies in Lincolnshire

References

Parliamentary constituencies in Lincolnshire
Constituencies of the Parliament of the United Kingdom established in 1997